Schizovalva is a genus of moths in the family Gelechiidae.

Species
 Schizovalva ablepta Janse, 1960
 Schizovalva adelosema Janse, 1960
 Schizovalva alaopis (Meyrick, 1921)
 Schizovalva anisofascia Janse, 1960
 Schizovalva bistrigata Janse, 1951
 Schizovalva blumenzweigella Legrand, 1958
 Schizovalva brunneotincta Janse, 1951
 Schizovalva brunneovesta Janse, 1960
 Schizovalva catharodes (Meyrick, 1920)
 Schizovalva celidota Janse, 1960
 Schizovalva cyrtogramma Janse, 1960
 Schizovalva ebenostriga Janse, 1960
 Schizovalva episema Janse, 1960
 Schizovalva exsulata (Meyrick, 1918)
 Schizovalva guillarmodi Janse, 1960
 Schizovalva hyperythra (Meyrick, 1921)
 Schizovalva isochorda (Meyrick, 1921)
 Schizovalva isophanes Janse, 1960
 Schizovalva leontianella Legrand, 1966
 Schizovalva leptochroa Janse, 1960
 Schizovalva leucogrisea Janse, 1951
 Schizovalva matutina (Meyrick, 1913)
 Schizovalva mesacta (Meyrick, 1909)
 Schizovalva naufraga (Meyrick, 1911)
 Schizovalva nigrifasciata Janse, 1951
 Schizovalva nigrosema Janse, 1960
 Schizovalva nubila Janse, 1960
 Schizovalva ochnias (Meyrick, 1913)
 Schizovalva ochrotincta Janse, 1951
 Schizovalva ophitis (Meyrick, 1913)
 Schizovalva perirrorata Janse, 1951
 Schizovalva peronectis (Meyrick, 1909)
 Schizovalva polygramma (Meyrick, 1914)
 Schizovalva prioleuca (Meyrick, 1911)
 Schizovalva rhodochra (Meyrick, 1913)
 Schizovalva rubigitincta Janse, 1951
 Schizovalva sarcographa (Meyrick, 1917)
 Schizovalva sphenopis (Meyrick, 1921)
 Schizovalva stasiarcha (Meyrick, 1913)
 Schizovalva trachypalpella Janse, 1960
 Schizovalva triplacopis (Meyrick, 1912)
 Schizovalva trisignis (Meyrick, 1908)
 Schizovalva unitincta Janse, 1960
 Schizovalva xerochroa Janse, 1951
 Schizovalva xylotincta Janse, 1951

Species recently removed from this genus
 Schizovalva exoenota (Meyrick, 1918) to Armatophallus exoenota (Meyrick, 1918)

References

Janse, 1951. Moths S. Afr. 5 : 270.
nhm.ac.uk Genus database

 
Gelechiini